Colin Connor may refer to:

 Colin Connor (actor) (born 1969), actor, comedian and writer
 Colin Connor (dancer) (born 1954), Canadian–British dancer, choreographer and educator